Hazel Dorothy Scott (June 11, 1920 – October 2, 1981) was a Trinidad-born American jazz and classical pianist and singer. She was an outspoken critic of racial discrimination and segregation. She used her influence to improve the representation of Black Americans in film.

Born in Port of Spain, Scott moved to New York City with her mother at the age of four. Scott was a child musical prodigy, receiving scholarships to study at the Juilliard School when she was eight. In her teens, she performed at Café Society while still at school. She also performed on the radio.

She was active as a jazz singer throughout the 1930s and 1940s. In 1950, she became the first black American to host her own TV show, The Hazel Scott Show. Her career in America faltered after she testified before the House Un-American Activities Committee in 1950 during the era of McCarthyism. Scott subsequently moved to Paris in 1957 and began performing in Europe, not returning to the United States until 1967.

Early life
Born in Port of Spain, Trinidad and Tobago, on June 11, 1920, Hazel Dorothy Scott was the only child of R. Thomas Scott, a West African scholar from Liverpool, England, and Alma Long Scott, a classically trained pianist, and music teacher. In 1924, the family moved from Trinidad to the United States and settled in Harlem, New York City. Her parents had separated by this time, and Scott lived with her mother and grandmother.

By now, Scott could play anything she heard on the piano. With her mother's guidance and training, she mastered advanced piano techniques and was labeled a child prodigy. A few years later, when Scott was eight years old, Professor Paul Wagner of the Juilliard School of Music accepted her as his own student. In 1933, her mother organized her own Alma Long Scott's All-Girl Jazz Band, where Scott played the piano and trumpet.

Career

By the age of 16, Hazel Scott regularly performed for radio programs for the Mutual Broadcasting System, gaining a reputation as the "hot classicist". In the mid-1930s, she also performed at the Roseland Dance Hall with the Count Basie Orchestra. Her early musical theatre appearances in New York included the Cotton Club Revue of 1938, Sing Out the News and The Priorities of 1942.

Throughout the 1930s and 1940s, Scott performed jazz, blues, ballads, Broadway and boogie-woogie songs, and classical music in various nightclubs. Thanks to the vision of Barney Josephson, the owner of Café Society, to establish a venue where artists of all races and ethnicities could perform, from 1939 to 1943, she was a leading attraction at both the downtown and uptown branches of Café Society. Her performances created national prestige for the practice of "swinging the classics." By 1945, Scott was earning $75,000 ($ today) a year.

Along with Lena Horne, Scott was one of the first black women to gain respectable roles in major Hollywood pictures. She refused to take roles in Hollywood playing a "singing maid", and she turned down the first four roles she was offered for this reason. When she began performing in Hollywood films, she insisted on having final cut privileges when it came to her appearance. She performed as herself in the films I Dood It (MGM, 1943), Broadway Rhythm (MGM, 1944) with Lena Horne, in the otherwise all-white cast of The Heat's On (Columbia, 1943), Something to Shout About (Columbia, 1943), and Rhapsody in Blue (Warner Bros, 1945). She appeared in five Hollywood films in all, always insisting on the credit line "Miss Hazel Scott as Herself", and wearing her own clothes and jewelry to protect her image. Her final break with Columbia Pictures' Harry Cohn involved "a costume which she felt stereotyped blacks." In the 1940s, in addition to her film appearances, she was featured in Café Society's From Bach to Boogie-Woogie concerts in 1941 and 1943 at Carnegie Hall.

She was the first person of African descent to have their own television show in America, The Hazel Scott Show, which premiered on the DuMont Television Network on July 3, 1950. Variety reported that "Hazel Scott has a neat little show in this modest package," its "most engaging element" being Scott herself. The show became so popular, it soon ran three times a week. On the show, Scott performed with the jazz musicians Charles Mingus and Max Roach who were among the members of her supporting band.

Activism and blacklisting

Civil rights
Scott had long been committed to civil rights. Scott refused to perform in segregated venues when she was on tour. She was once escorted from the city of Austin, Texas by Texas Rangers because she refused to perform when she discovered that black and white patrons were seated separately. "Why would anyone come to hear me, a Negro," she told Time magazine, "and refuse to sit beside someone just like me?"

In 1949, Scott brought a suit against the owners of a Pasco, Washington restaurant when a waitress refused to serve Scott and her traveling companion, Mrs. Eunice Wolfe, because "they were Negroes." Scott's victory helped African Americans challenge racial discrimination in Spokane, as well as inspiring civil rights organizations "to pressure the Washington state legislature to enact the Public Accommodations Act" in 1953.

McCarthyism
With the advent of the Red Scare in the television industry, Scott's name appeared in Red Channels: A Report on Communist Influence in Radio and Television in June 1950. In an effort to clear her name, Scott voluntarily appeared before the House Un-American Activities Committee (HUAC) on September 22, 1950, and insisted on reading a prepared statement. She denied that she was "ever knowingly connected with the Communist Party or any of its front organizations." However, she stated that she had supported Communist Party member Benjamin J. Davis's run for City Council, arguing that Davis was supported by socialists, a group that "has hated Communists longer and more fiercely than any other." She also expressed her frustrations with the mass amount of false accusations of entertainers and offered the suggestion to use "democratic methods to immediately eliminate a good many irresponsible charges." Scott concluded her statement to the HUAC with a request that entertainers be not already "covered with the mud of slander and the filth of scandal" when proving their loyalty to the United States.

Her television variety program, The Hazel Scott Show, was cancelled a week after Scott appeared before HUAC, on September 29, 1950. Scott suffered a nervous breakdown in 1951. On returning to full health, Scott continued to perform in the United States and Europe, even getting sporadic bookings on television variety shows like Cavalcade of Stars and guest starring in an episode of CBS Television's Faye Emerson's Wonderful Town musical series. Scott's short-lived television show "provided a glimmer of hope for African American viewers" during a time of continued racial bias in the broadcasting industry and economic hardships for jazz musicians in general. Scott remained publicly opposed to McCarthyism and racial segregation throughout her career.

In France (1957–67)
To evade political fallout in the United States, Scott moved to Paris in 1957. She appeared in the French film Le désordre et la nuit (1958). In 1963, she marched with a number of other African-American expatriates, including James Baldwin, to the US Embassy in Paris to demonstrate support of the upcoming March on Washington.

Later US years (1967–81)
She did not return to the US until 1967. By this time, the Civil Rights Movement had led to federal legislation making racial segregation in housing and public accommodations illegal and enforcing the protection of voting rights of all citizens in addition to other social advances.

Scott continued to perform occasionally in nightclubs, while also appearing on daytime television, until the year of her death. She made her television acting debut in 1973, on the ABC daytime soap opera One Life to Live, performing a wedding song at the nuptials of her "onscreen cousin" Carla Gray Hall, portrayed by Ellen Holly.

Personal life
Although a Catholic, in 1945 Scott married Baptist minister and US Congressman Adam Clayton Powell. The couple had one child, Adam Clayton Powell III, but divorced in 1960 after a separation. Their relationship provoked controversy, as Powell was married when their affair began. At the end of 1960, Powell married his secretary.

On January 19, 1961, Scott married Ezio Bedin, a Swiss-Italian comedian who was fifteen years her junior; they divorced a few years later, before her return to the US.

Bahá'í Faith
Scott was also a member of the Baháʼí Faith. She was at Vic Damone's career re-announcement in late 1968. She was introduced by Damone to the crowd recalling how he was an usher for her show. This might have been the November 1942 performance by Scott and others at the Paramount Theatre. Damone also told the crowd in 1968 that she had just recently been at a Bahá'í fireside, an informational meeting of the religion, at his home and had joined the religion – Scott was very moved and in tears. She joined the religion following heartfelt conversations with Dizzy Gillespie. Scott also sang at a October 1970 award dinner in New York – singing "When the World was Young", "A lonely Christmas", "Put a Little Love in Your Heart" for an International Education Year Award to James L. Olivero, who remembered Louis Gregory, presented by Daniel Jordan of the Bahá'ís on behalf of the US National Spiritual Assembly. Her singing was praised by Whitney Young, Executive Director of the National Urban League, who was speaking at the event. A musicale was held in Kingston, Jamaica, in May 1971, entitled "The Sounds of a New World", co-presented by Scott with Dizzy Gillespie, Seals and Crofts, and Linda Marshall and others, as part of a ship-and-shore conference of Bahá’ís.

Death
On October 2, 1981, Hazel Scott died of cancer at Mount Sinai Hospital in Manhattan. She was 61 years old and survived by her son Adam Clayton Powell III. She is buried at Flushing Cemetery in Queens, New York, near other musicians such as Louis Armstrong, Johnny Hodges, and Dizzy Gillespie (who died in 1993).

Legacy
Scott was renowned as a virtuosic jazz pianist, in addition to her successes in dramatic acting and classical music. She also used her status as one of the best-known African-American entertainers of her generation to shine a spotlight on issues of racial injustice and civil rights.
Scott recorded as the leader of various groups for Decca, Columbia and Signature, among them a trio that consisted of Bill English and the double bass player Martin Rivera, and another trio with Charles Mingus on bass and Rudie Nichols on drums. Her 1955 album Relaxed Piano Moods on the Debut label, with Mingus and Roach, is generally her work most highly regarded by critics today. Her unique swinging style and fusion of jazz and classical influences kept her in demand for performances through the very end of her life.

Singer-songwriter Alicia Keys cited Scott as her inspiration for her performance at the 61st Grammy Awards, saying: "I've been thinking about people who inspire me; shout out to Hazel Scott, I've always wanted to play two pianos."

In 2020, she was the subject of the BBC World Service programme Hazel Scott: Jazz star and barrier breaker in the series The Forum.

In "When Women Invented Television," author Jennifer Keishin Armstrong features her as one of four women who had a major influence on the medium.<ref>'When Women Invented Television' Gives 1940s, '50s Creative Powerhouses Their Due, National Public Radio, March 20, 2021. Retrieved April 17, 2021.</ref>

In 2022, Dance Theatre of Harlem debuted a new ballet about the life of Hazel Scott.

Selected discography
 Swinging the Classics: Piano Solos in Swing Style with Drums (Decca #A-212 [78rpm 3-disc album set], 1941)
 Her Second Album of Piano Solos with Drums Acc. (Decca #A-321 [78rpm 3-disc album set], 1942)
 A Piano Recital (Signature #S-1 [78rpm 4-disc album set], 1946)
 Great Scott! (Columbia #C-159 [78rpm 4-disc album set], 1948; Columbia #CL-6090 [10" LP], 1950)
 Two Toned Piano Recital (Coral #CRL-56057 [10" LP], 1952)
 Hazel Scott's Late Show (Capitol #H-364 [10" LP], 1953)
 Relaxed Piano Moods (Debut #DLP-16 [10" LP], 1955)
 Round Midnight (Decca #DL-8474, 1957)
 Always (Image Records #IM-307, 1979)
 After Hours (Tioch Digital Records #TD-1013, 1983)

References

Sources
 "Bye-Bye Boogie: Hazel Scott leaves night clubs and moves to concert stage", Ebony, November 1945: 31–34.
 "Café Society Concert." Time Magazine, May 5, 1941.
 "Hazel Scott is Queen Once More in Warner's 'Rhapsody in Blue'", Chicago Defender, September 1, 1945: 14.
 McAfee, J., Jr., "Scott, Hazel", CBY 1943 Obituary, JSN, ii/4 (1982), 19.
 Bogle, Donald. 2001. "The Hazel Scott Show", in Primetime Blues: African Americans on Network Television. New York: Farrar, Straus and Giroux, pp. 15–19.
 
 Feather, Leonard. "Swinging the Classics", The New York Times, May 18, 1941: X5.
 McGee, Kristin. "Swinging the Classics: Hazel Scott and Hollywood's Musical-Racial Matrix," in Some Liked it Hot: Jazz Women in Film and Television, 1928–1959 (Middletown, CT: Wesleyan University Press 2009) 113–133.
 Myter-Spencer, D.: "Hazel Scott, Jazz Pianist: Boogie-woogie and Beyond," Jazz Research Papers, x (1990), 75.
 Reed, Bill. 1998. "The Movies: Hazel Scott", in Hot From Harlem: Profiles in Classic African-American Entertainment, Los Angeles: Cellar Door Press, pp. 110–128.
 Taubman, E. 1941. "Café Music Heard at Carnegie Hall", The New York Times, April 24, 1941: 24.
 Taubman, E. 1943. "Swing feature Soviet Benefit: Café Society assures at least a thousand watches for the Russian Fighting Forces," The New York Times, April 12, 1943: 28.
 Taylor, A. "Hazel Scott", Notes and Tones: Musician-to-Musician Interviews (Liège, Belgium, 1977, rev. and enlarged February 1993).

 Further reading 
 

External links

 
 Hazel Scott on Marian McPartland's Piano Jazz on NPR
 Episode 101: "The Promise (Biography of Hazel Scott)". Nate DiMeo, The Memory Palace'' (podcast), December 19, 2016.

1920 births
1981 deaths
20th-century American pianists
20th-century American singers
20th-century American women singers
20th-century Bahá'ís
American Bahá'ís
American women jazz singers
American jazz pianists
American jazz singers
American women pianists
Burials at Flushing Cemetery
Deaths from cancer in New York (state)
Deaths from pancreatic cancer
Hollywood blacklist
Jazz musicians from New York (state)
Juilliard School alumni
Powell family of New York
Singers from New York City
Trinidad and Tobago emigrants to the United States
African-American Catholics
African-American women musicians